Muhoroni is an electoral constituency in Kenya. It is one of seven constituencies of Kisumu County.

The constituency was established for the 1988  elections, when it was split from the Nyando Constituency. It was one of three constituencies of the former Nyando District.

Members of Parliament

Wards

References 

Constituencies in Kisumu County
Constituencies in Nyanza Province
1988 establishments in Kenya
Constituencies established in 1988